Anton Trstenjak (8 January 1906 – 29 September 1996) was Slovene psychologist, theologian, and author. He is notable as a pioneer of Slovenian clinical psychology and was practicing his own Logotherapy-inspired psychotherapy. As author he wrote books in specific areas of applied psychology such as ecological psychology, pastoral psychology, psychology of work and organization, and his overview of the field of psychology in general.

Life
Anton Trstenjak was born into a family of small farmers in Rodmošci near Gornja Radgona, at the time part of Austrian Empire, now Slovenia. After elementary school in Negova, and a high school in Maribor, he went to University of Innsbruck to become a Roman Catholic priest, however, he first got a Doctor degree in philosophy in 1929, and four years later in theology. He went to study further in Paris between 1935 and 1937, and then to Milan, where he specialized in experimental psychology at Agostino Gemelli between 1941 and 1942.

Work

Teaching
Since 1940 until his retirement in 1973, he was teaching psychology and philosophy at the Roman Catholic Faculty of Theology in Ljubljana.

Experimental psychology of color perception
Upon conducting his experiments, he proposed there exists an inverse quantitative relationship between the reaction times, on one hand, and wavelengths, on the other hand, in perception of colors by humans.

Membership
Since 1953, he was member of the Paris-based International Association for Applied Psychology. Since 1979, he was member of Slovenian Academy of Sciences and Arts and since 1993, a member of European Academy of Sciences and Arts.

Further reading
 2007 Anton Trstenjak's 100 Years Anniversary Slovenian Academy of Sciences and Arts Symposium, with 17 participating authors.

References

1906 births
1996 deaths
People from the Municipality of Gornja Radgona
Slovenian psychologists
Slovenian theologians
Members of the European Academy of Sciences and Arts
Members of the Slovenian Academy of Sciences and Arts
20th-century psychologists